Valeryan Andreyevich Uryvaev was an eminent Soviet hydrologist and the head of Russian State Hydrological Institute in 1942–1968. A research vessel was named after him.

Hydrologists
Soviet scientists